In gridiron football, a touchdown pass is a pass thrown from the passer (usually the quarterback) to a receiver that results in a touchdown being scored. The pass can either be caught in the end zone itself, resulting in an immediate touchdown, or in the field of play, followed by the receiver carrying the ball into the endzone himself for the score. Either way, the quarterback is credited in his statistics with the touchdown pass.

The term "touchdown pass" is mostly used for statistical purposes for the quarterback. The statistic is considered to be highly prestigious among quarterbacks, and is one of the four factors in determining the passer rating. 

In the game, the effect is simply the scoring of a touchdown (6 points). When a touchdown is achieved by running, the quarterback is not credited with a touchdown pass.

See also
List of National Football League records (individual) #Passing touchdowns
List of National Football League passing touchdowns leaders
Most consecutive games with a touchdown pass (NFL)

References

American football terminology